Pelatantheria bicuspidata is a species of epiphytic or lithophytic orchid occurring in China and Thailand. This species closely resembles Pelatantheria ctenoglossum and Pelatantheria woonchengii. The specific epithet bicuspidata, derived from the Latin word bicuspidatus, meaning double pointed refers to the two pointed distal portion of the labellum.  The stems are elongate, branched and bear elliptic-oblong, unequally bilobed, distichously arranged leaves. The flowers open widely and bear purple or red striations on petals and sepals. The labellum is fleshy, three-lobed and spurred at the base. The column bears tufted white hairs at its base.

Ecology
This species if found in open forests at  a.s.l. on rocks or tree trunks. Flowering occurs in June to October.

Conservation
This species is protected under the Convention on International Trade in Endangered Species of Wild Fauna and Flora CITES and thus is regarded as potentially endangered.

References

bicuspidata
Orchids of China
Orchids of Thailand
Plants described in 1951